Maurício Donizete Ramos Júnior (born April 10, 1985 in Piracicaba) is a Brazilian footballer who plays as a centre back who plays for XV de Piracicaba.

Honours

Club
Coritiba
 Paraná State Championship: 2008

Palmeiras
Copa do Brasil: 2012

References

External links

1985 births
Living people
Brazilian footballers
Brazilian expatriate footballers
Iraty Sport Club players
Associação Desportiva São Caetano players
Coritiba Foot Ball Club players
Sharjah FC players
Sociedade Esportiva Palmeiras players
Adanaspor footballers
Çaykur Rizespor footballers
Al-Sailiya SC players
Campeonato Brasileiro Série A players
Campeonato Brasileiro Série B players
UAE Pro League players
TFF First League players
Qatar Stars League players
Expatriate footballers in the United Arab Emirates
Expatriate footballers in Turkey
Expatriate footballers in Qatar
Brazilian expatriate sportspeople in the United Arab Emirates
Brazilian expatriate sportspeople in Turkey
Brazilian expatriate sportspeople in Qatar
Association football defenders
People from Piracicaba
Footballers from São Paulo (state)